The Cambodian People's Party (CPP) is a Cambodian political party which has ruled Cambodia since 1979. Founded in 1951, it was originally known as the Kampuchean People's Revolutionary Party (KPRP).

During the Cold War it adopted a revisionist view of Marxism and allied itself with Vietnam and the Soviet Union, in contrast to the pro-Chinese Communist Party of Kampuchea led by Pol Pot. After toppling the Khmer Rouge regime with the Vietnamese-backed liberation of Phnom Penh, it became the ruling party of the People's Republic of Kampuchea (1979–1989), which was later renamed the State of Cambodia (1989–1991). The party's current name was adopted during the final year of the State of Cambodia, when the party abandoned the one-party system and Marxism–Leninism.

Originally rooted in communist and Marxist–Leninist ideologies, the party took on a more reformist outlook in the mid-1980s under Heng Samrin. In 1991, the CPP officially dropped its commitment to socialism, and has since embraced a mixed economy and conservative authoritarianism. Along with the major parties of the European centre-right, the CPP is a member of the Centrist Democrat International.

History

Forerunner organizations and early history 
Nationalists in Cambodia, Vietnam and Laos held the belief that to successfully liberate themselves from France they needed to work together; the nationalists formed the supranational Indochinese Communist Party (ICP) to oppose the French in 1930.

However, the triumph of the Japanese during the early stage of World War II crippled French rule and helped to nurture nationalism in all three Indochinese countries. Consequently, the idea of an Indochinese-wide party was submerged in the rhetoric of fierce nationalism. In Cambodia, growing nationalist sentiment and national pride married historical mistrust and fear of neighbouring countries, which turned out to be a stumbling block for the ICP. On 28 June 1951, the Cambodian nationalists who struggled to free Cambodia from French colonial rule split from the ICP to form the Kampuchean People's Revolutionary Party (KPRP).

In 1955, the KPRP established a subsidiary party named the Pracheachon in order to run in the national election that year. The name of the party was changed to the Workers' Party of Kampuchea (WPK) on 28 September 1960 and then to the Communist Party of Kampuchea (CPK) in 1966. Members of the CPK moved the party's headquarters to Ratanakiri Province, where they were termed "Khmer Rouge" by Prince Norodom Sihanouk.

Pen Sovan's leadership (1979–1981) 
In early 1979, the Cambodian communists who overthrew the Khmer Rouge's regime to end the genocide held a congress. At this gathering, they declared themselves the true successors of the original KPRP founded in 1951 and labelled the congress as the Third Party Congress, thus not recognizing the 1963, 1975 and 1978 congresses of CPK as legitimate. The party considered 28 June 1951 as its founding date. A national committee led by Pen Sovan and Roh Samai was appointed by the Congress. The women's wing of the party, the National Association of Women for the Salvation of Kampuchea, was also established in 1979 with a vast national network of members that extended to the district level.

The existence of the party was kept secret until its 4th congress in May 1981, when it appeared publicly and assumed the name KPRP. The name-change was stated to be carried out "to clearly distinguish it from the reactionary Pol Pot party and to underline and reassert the continuity of the party's best traditions".

Heng Samrin's leadership (1981–1991) 
As of 1990, members of the Politburo were Heng Samrin (General Secretary), Chea Sim, Hun Sen, Chea Soth, Math Ly, Tea Banh, Men Sam An, Nguon Nhel, Sar Kheng, Bou Thang, Ney Pena, Say Chhum and alternate members included Sing Song, Sim Ka and Pol Saroeun. Members of the Secretariat were Heng Samrin, Say Phouthang, Bou Thang, Men Sam An and Sar Kheng.

Hun Sen's leadership (1991–present) 

In 1991, the party was renamed Cambodian People's Party (CPP) during a United Nations-sponsored peace and reconciliation process. Politburo and the Secretariat to enter into the new Standing Committee, Chea Sim as President and Hun Sen as Vice-president. Despite being rooted in socialism, the CPP was not ideologically blind. In fact, it has always adopted a pragmatic approach in order to keep power. For instance, the CPP played an indispensable role in Cambodian peace negotiation process, which led to the signing of the Paris Peace Accords on 23 October 1991 and the creation of the second Kingdom of Cambodia. The CPP ousted Nodorom Ranariddh in a coup in 1997, leaving the party with no serious opposition. Thirty-two people died in the coup.

Under the leadership of the CPP, Cambodia has been transformed from a war-torn country to a lower-middle-income economy in 2016. It aims to turn Cambodia into a higher-middle-income country by 2030 and high-income country by 2050. Ideologically, an increasing number of CPP senior leaders claim that the Cambodian ruling party has adopted a centrist position. They believe that it is the middle path between extreme capitalism and extreme socialism, with the emphasis on the values and principles of social market economy in which free market economy goes hand in hand with social and environmental protection, and the promotion of humanism guided by Buddhist teaching. However, academics such as John Ciorciari have observed that the CPP still continues to maintain its communist-era party structures and that many of its top-ranking members were derived from KPRP. Also, despite Hun Sen being only the deputy leader of the party until 2015, he had de facto control of the party. Prime Minister Hun Sen has continued to lead the party to election victories after the transition to democracy.

It won 64 of the 123 seats in the National Assembly in the 1998 elections, 73 seats in the 2003 elections and 90 seats in the 2008 elections, winning the popular vote by the biggest margin ever for a National Assembly election with 58% of the vote. The CPP also won the 2006 Senate elections. The party lost 22 seats in the 2013 elections, with opposition gained. Since 2018 Cambodian general election, the party commands all 125 seats in the National Assembly, and 58 of 62 seats in the Senate. The main opposition, Cambodia National Rescue Party (CNRP), was banned before the election.   Hun Sen, the Prime Minister of Cambodia, has served as the CPP's President since 2015.

Party leadership (1979–1993) 
 Heng Samrin: 
 General Secretary of the KPRP (1981–1991)
 Chairman of the Revolutionary Council (later the Council of State) (1979–1992)
 Chea Sim: 
 Minister of the Interior (1979–1981)
 President of the National Assembly (1981–92), 
 Chairman of the Council of State (1992–1994)
 Pen Sovan: 
 Minister of Defense (1979–1981); 
 General Secretary of the KPRP (1979–81); 
 Prime Minister (1981)
 Hun Sen: 
 Minister of Foreign Affairs (1979–1986; 1987–1990); 
 Deputy Prime Minister (1981–85), 
 Prime Minister (1985–1993)
 Chan Sy: 
 Minister of defense (1981–1982), 
 Prime Minister (1981–1984)
 Say Phouthang: 
 Vice President of the State Council (1979–1993)
 Chea Soth: 
 Minister of Planning (1982–1986), 
 Deputy Prime Minister (1982–1992)
 Bou Thang: 
 Deputy Prime Minister (1982–1992), 
 Minister of Defense (1982–1986)
 Math Ly: 
 Vice President of the National Assembly
 Kong Korm: 
 Minister of Foreign Affairs (1986–1987)
 Hor Namhong: 
 Minister of Foreign Affairs (1990–1993)

List of party leaders

 KPRP (General Secretary)  CPP (President)

Organization 
The party is headed by a 34-member Permanent Committee, commonly referred to as the Politburo (after its former Communist namesake). The current members are (with their party positions in brackets):
 
 Hun Sen (Chairman)
 Heng Samrin (Honorary Chairman)
 Sar Kheng (Deputy Chairman)
 Say Chhum (Chairman of the Standing Committee)
 Say Phouthang 
 Bou Thang
 Tea Banh
 Men Sam An
 Nguon Nhel 
 Ney Pena
 Sim Ka
 Ke Kim Yan
 Pol Saroeun
 Kong Sam Ol
 Im Chhun Lim
 Dith Munty
 Chea Chanto
 Uk Rabun
 Cheam Yeap
 Ek Sam Ol
 Som Kim Suor
 Khuon Sudary
 Pen Pannha
 Chhay Than
 Hor Nam Hong
 Bin Chhin
 Keat Chhon
 Yim Chhay Ly
 Tep Ngorn
 Kun Kim
 Meas Sophea
 Neth Savoeun

Recent electoral history

General election

Communal elections

Senate elections

See also 
 Kampuchean United Front for National Salvation
 Modern Cambodia
 People's Republic of Kampuchea
 Politics of Cambodia

References

Notes

Citations

Bibliography 
Guo, Sujian (2006). The Political Economy of Asian Transition from Communism. Ashgate Publishing, Ltd. .

External links
CPP website
List of incidents attributed to the Cambodian Peoples Party on the START database

1951 establishments in Cambodia
Communist parties in Cambodia
Conservative parties in Cambodia
Formerly ruling communist parties
Hun Sen
Nationalist parties in Cambodia
Organizations of the Third Indochina War
Parties of one-party systems
People's Republic of Kampuchea
Political parties established in 1951
Political parties in Cambodia